Sayeed Hassan Kanan (born 15 February 1964) is a former Bangladeshi footballer who played as a goalkeeper. During his playing days, he was popularly known by his nickname Kanan, pronounced Ka-non. 

He started his career with Naveen Krira Chakra and rose to prominence while playing for leading Dhaka club Mohammedan SC during the 1980s and 1990s. At his peak, he was the finest goalkeeper in the country, and represented the Bangladesh national team numerous times. 

Since his retirement, he has remained active in football. Starting from 2002 until 2008, he was part of national team coaching panel. He currently serves as the goalkeeping coach of his former club Mohammedan SC.

Early life
Kanan's family included six siblings, and his father worked at the Bangladesh Government Press, also known as Central Press.
After the Bangladesh Liberation War, his family struggled financially, thus Kanan urged to become a footballer at office clubs, such as Team BJMC, Customs, Qaumi Jute Mills and various other spinning mills.

Club career
Kanan grew up in the Badda area of Dhaka, and in 1979, he started playing in the Pioneer Football League with Naveen Krira Chakra, which is now Badda Jagoroni. In December 1979, Irish coach William Bill Hart of Dhaka League giants Abahani Krira Chakra held a goalkeeper tiral, for which players had to pay 30 rupees to join. Although, Kanan stood in line without paying, he was the first player selected by the coach.

However, with Mohamed Mohsin being the first choice goalkeeper at Abahani, coach Ali Imam fixed Kanan a move to Farashganj SC, who were recently prmoted from the Second Division. He spent his first season at the club as the second choice, earning 30 thousand rupees, and by 1982 he became a regular face in the lineup. In 1983, he joined Brothers Union, and after a third place finish in his debut season at the club, Kanan moved to Mohammedan SC.

At Mohammedan SC he was the main goalkeeper for more than a decade, winning the Dhaka League five times, and was also part of the team which defeated Iranian giants Persepolis to reach the semi-final league round of the 1990–91 Asian Club Championship. He was the mainstay between the post as The Black and Whites were unbeaten in the league from 8 September 1985 to 15 March 1990.  In the final of the 1991 Independence Cup, he saved four shots in the tiebreaker against Abahani. In 1996, he conceded only six goals in the Dhaka League and retired from playing, as Mohammedan SC became undefeated champions.

International career
Kanan replaced the injured Moinul Islam in the Bangladesh team for the 1986 FIFA World Cup qualifiers in Indonesia. Although he did not get selected from the main camp held by coach Abdur Rahim, a second selection round under the observation of Bangladesh Football Federation president Hafizuddin Ahmed, saw Kanan get a place in the team. In the national team he was mainly the second choice goalkeeper to Mohamed Mohsin. Nontheless, he played three games at the 1988 AFC Asian Cup qualifiers, and was the main goalkeeper under Nasser Hejazi at the 1989 South Asian Games in Islamabad, Pakistan. His mistake against Pakistan in the final was heavily criticised by both media and fans. He collided into defender Monem Munna, while trying to clear the ball and missed, leaving an empty post as Haji Abdul Sattar scored. Kanan was the captain of the Bangladesh Red team that defeated South Korea University on penalties at the Bangladesh President's Gold Cup final, 1989. His international career came to an end after the 1994 FIFA World Cup qualifiers, during which Bangladesh suffered a 8–0 defeat at the hands of Japan.

Coaching career
Knan also received the Dhaka University Blue award. After that, I was also elected Sports Secretary in the Dhaka University Central Students' Union election of 1990 by getting the highest number of votes. Since 2002 Kanan has been involved wit the Bangladesh Football Federation, and in 2004, he was part of the National Team Management Committee (NTMC).
During the 2003 SAFF Championship, Kanan was the general manager of the title winning team under György Kottán. In 2005, Kanan was appointed as the Bangladesh general manager under head coach Andrés Cruciani.

In June 2007, it was reported that some sports organisers allegedly made money by using their offices to get contracts from the National Sports Council during the BNP-led government, and Kanon was one of them, Following these accusations he was removed from his post in the Federation, only to be reappointed in 2008.

In October 2021, he joined Mohammedan SC as the goalkeeping coach under Sean Lane.  In addition to the AFC license, Kanan also completed position goalkeeper courses level 1 and level 2. He was the Bangladesh U17 goalkeeping coach at the 2022 SAFF U-17 Championship in Colombo, Sri Lanka.

Honours
Mohammedan SC
Dhaka Premier Division League = 1986, 1987, 1988–89, 1993, 1996
Federation Cup = 1987, 1989, 1995
Independence Cup = 1991
DMFA Cup = 1993, 1995
Bangladesh
 South Asian Games Silver medal: 1985, 1989; Bronze medal: 1991

References

Bangladeshi footballers
Bangladesh international footballers
1964 births
Living people
Association football goalkeepers
Abahani Limited (Dhaka) players
Farashganj SC players
Brothers Union players
Mohammedan SC (Dhaka) players
Footballers at the 1990 Asian Games
Footballers at the 1986 Asian Games
Asian Games competitors for Bangladesh
South Asian Games silver medalists for Bangladesh
South Asian Games bronze medalists for Bangladesh